Jose B. Gonzalez is a Latino poet and educator.

Gonzalez authored the poetry collections, Toys Made of Rock (Bilingual Review Press, 2015), and When Love Was Reels (Arte Public Press, 2017), and with John S. Christie, served as Co-Editor of Latino Boom: An Anthology of U.S. Latino Literature.  He was born in San Salvador, El Salvador in 1967, where he lived until he was eight. After his father and then his mother migrated to the U.S., he rejoined his family when he migrated to New London, Connecticut in 1976.

He has appeared as a guest poet on Univision and American Latino TV and has been a contributor to Hispanic Outlook in Higher Education and National Public Radio (NPR).

His poetry has been published in Quercus Review, Callaloo, The Teacher's Voice, Palabra, Acentos Review, and Colere, and anthologies including Coloring Book, Nantucket: A Collection, and Latino Boom: An Anthology of U.S. Latino Literature, and Ocho. He founded LatinoStories.com.

He is a graduate of New London High School, and holds a Bachelor of Science from Bryant University, a Master's in Teaching English from Brown University, and a Ph.D. in English from the University of Rhode Island. He is a professor of English at the United States Coast Guard Academy in New London, Connecticut.

Awards
He is the recipient of the following awards:
 2003 National Association of Multicultural Education CT Faculty of the Year
 2006 NEATE Poet of the Year
 2009 American Association of Hispanics in Higher Education (AAHHE) Outstanding Latino Faculty of the Year
 2011-2012 Fulbright Scholar
 2015 Latino De Oro (Arts and Culture)
 2015 International Latino Book Award Finalist 
 2018 Connecticut Book Award Finalist (Poetry) for When Love Was Reels
 2019 Connecticut Department of Economic and Community Development Artistic Excellence Fellowship

Works

Poetry collections

Editor

Poems in Anthologies

Speaking career
Gonzalez has been a featured speaker throughout the country including at Fairfield University, Rutgers University Pittsburg State University (Kansas), Del Mar College (Corpus Christi, Texas), Cornell University  Connecticut College, The Smithsonian Museum of the American Indian in Washington DC, at festivals such as the Newburyport Literary Festival, and the Sunken Garden Poetry Festival. He has presented his poetry in countries such as El Salvador and Spain.

References

External links
 Personal site
 LatinoStories.com
 https://www.poetryfoundation.org/poems-and-poets/poets/detail/jose-b-gonzalez

1967 births
American people of Salvadoran descent
American writers of Salvadoran descent
American male poets
Bryant University alumni
Brown University alumni
Hispanic and Latino American poets
Writers from New London, Connecticut
Salvadoran poets
Male poets
Salvadoran male writers
University of Rhode Island alumni
Poets from Connecticut
Living people
21st-century American poets
21st-century American male writers